Theatre Products is a Japanese fashion brand founded in 2001 and currently based in Roppongi, Tokyo.  The brand's founders, and as of 2007, its main designers are Akira Takeuchi and Tayuka Nakanishi.  The brand has retail outlets in the Harajuku and Shibuya areas of Tokyo, known as centers of youth fashion.

External links
 Theatre Products Official Website (Japanese & English)
 Article in English on Theatre Products Fall/Winter 2009-2010 Collection

Clothing brands of Japan